Park Avenue is a proposed Tri-Rail Coastal Link Green Line station in Lake Park, Florida. The station is planned for construction at Old Dixie Highway and Park Avenue.

References

External links
 Proposed site in Google Maps Street View

Tri-Rail stations in Palm Beach County, Florida
Proposed Tri-Rail stations